Kao Yu-jen or Gao Yuren (pinyin)(born 30 August 1934) is a Taiwanese politician.

Education and personal life
Kao studied law at National Taiwan University. Eric Chu is married to Kao's daughter Kao Wan-ching. Kao's son Kao Su-po has served as a legislator.

Political career
Kao was elected to the Taiwan Provincial Assembly in 1968, and served a single term. From 1973 to 1976, Kao was Tainan County Magistrate. He was then appointed vice minister of the interior and later served as director of civil affairs within Taiwan Provincial Government. Kao returned to the Taiwan Provincial Assembly in 1981, and became the legislative body's youngest speaker at the age of 47. He stepped down from the assembly in 1989, and failed to secure the presidential nomination for Governor of Taiwan Province, which was given to Lien Chan. Instead Kao assumed the chairmanship of China Television Company and served concurrently as adviser to president Lee Teng-hui. Kao won election to the Legislative Yuan in 1992, allied himself with the "non-mainstream faction" of the Kuomintang in opposition to Lee, and contested the speakership, losing the office to Liu Sung-pan. From 1993 to 1999, Kao represented Tainan County. He was elected to two more term via party list proportional representation, but did not often attend legislative sessions.

Business career
Kao held several business interests and executive positions, including in Minyu Machinery, Shang Mao Electronics, and Paoyi Technology, Kuowei Mass Communication, Twinhead International Corporation, Vtron Technology, Greater Tainan Natural Gas Company, Euroc Venture Capital Company, Everterminal, and  Tai Tung Communication Company.

References

1934 births
Living people
Party List Members of the Legislative Yuan
Tainan Members of the Legislative Yuan
Members of the 2nd Legislative Yuan
Members of the 3rd Legislative Yuan
Members of the 4th Legislative Yuan
Members of the 5th Legislative Yuan
Kuomintang Members of the Legislative Yuan in Taiwan
National Taiwan University alumni
20th-century Taiwanese businesspeople
21st-century Taiwanese businesspeople
Magistrates of Tainan County
Senior Advisors to President Lee Teng-hui
Taiwanese Ministers of the Interior